Yekaterina Nemich (born 3 January 1995) is a Kazakhstani synchronized swimmer. She competed in the women's duet at the 2016 Summer Olympics. She is the twin sister of Alexandra Nemich.

References

1995 births
Living people
Kazakhstani synchronized swimmers
Olympic synchronized swimmers of Kazakhstan
Synchronized swimmers at the 2016 Summer Olympics
Synchronized swimmers at the 2020 Summer Olympics
People from Temirtau
Asian Games medalists in artistic swimming
Artistic swimmers at the 2010 Asian Games
Artistic swimmers at the 2014 Asian Games
Artistic swimmers at the 2018 Asian Games
Medalists at the 2010 Asian Games
Medalists at the 2014 Asian Games
Medalists at the 2018 Asian Games
Asian Games bronze medalists for Kazakhstan
Synchronized swimmers at the 2017 World Aquatics Championships
Artistic swimmers at the 2019 World Aquatics Championships
Twin sportspeople
Kazakhstani twins
21st-century Kazakhstani women